All Jacked Up is the second studio album by American country music artist Gretchen Wilson, released in 2005 on Epic Nashville (see 2005 in country music). It debuted at number one in the Billboard 200 with 264,000 copies sold in its initial week. The album's title track served as its lead-off single. Debuting at No. 21 on the Billboard Hot Country Songs charts, it set what was then the record for the highest-debuting single by a female country artist. "All Jacked Up" went on to peak at No. 8 on the country charts, and was followed by three more singles: "I Don't Feel Like Loving You Today" (No. 22), "Politically Uncorrect" (No. 23), and "California Girls" (No. 25). Overall, All Jacked Up was certified platinum by the RIAA for shipments of one million copies in the U.S.

Also featured on this album are "He Ain't Even Cold Yet" (which was originally recorded by Ken Mellons on his 1995 album Where Forever Begins) and a remake of Billie Holiday's pop standard "Good Morning Heartache".

Track listing

Personnel
Compiled from liner notes.
Tom Bukovac – electric guitar
J. T. Corenflos – acoustic guitar, electric guitar
Chad Cromwell – drums
Eric Darken – percussion
Shannon Forrest – drums
Paul Franklin – steel guitar
Kenny Greenberg – electric guitar
Merle Haggard – vocals on "Politically Uncorrect"
Dean Hall – electric guitar
Wes Hightower – background vocals
Mike Johnson – steel guitar
Liana Manis – background vocals
Steve Nathan – piano, Hammond organ
Jon Nicholson – background vocals
Russ Pahl – steel guitar
Michael Rhodes – bass guitar
Bryan Sutton – acoustic guitar
John Willis – acoustic guitar
Gretchen Wilson – acoustic guitar, lead vocals, background vocals
Glenn Worf – bass guitar
Jonathan Yudkin – fiddle

Chart performance

Weekly charts

Year-end charts

Singles

Certifications

References

External links
 All Jacked Up review on USA Today

2005 albums
Epic Records albums
Gretchen Wilson albums
Albums produced by John Rich
Albums produced by Mark Wright (record producer)